Ana Rocha Fernandes is a Cape-Verdian film director, screenwriter and editor.

Fernandes was born in Santiago, Cape Verde. She was a teacher in Cape Verde, and then moved to Germany to study architecture at the University of Siegen, before studying film at the Film Academy Baden-Württemberg in Ludwigsburg. She now lives in Stuttgart.

Selected filmography
Das Rauschen des Meeres (The Sound of the Sea), 2010 short drama
, 2013
Rabelados - Die gewaltlosen Rebellen der kapverdischen Inseln (Rabelados - The Non-Violent Rebels of the Cape Verde Islands), 2000 documentary about the Rabelados

Awards
Das Rauschen des Meeres 
Best Short Film,  2010
Jury Prize, Cape Verde Film Festival 2011
Rabelados – die gewaltlosen Rebellen der Kapverdischen Inseln
Honorable mention at the Locarno International Film Festival
Best Film / Press Prize,  (FICA), Brazil

References

External links

Year of birth missing (living people)
Living people
Women film directors
People from Santiago, Cape Verde
Cape Verdean film directors